Sphaerocarpos drewiae is a species of liverwort in the family Sphaerocarpaceae. It is endemic to California, where it is known from San Diego and Riverside Counties. Its common name is bottle liverwort.

This liverwort grows in shady spots in coastal sage scrub habitat. It is associated with another rare endemic liverwort, Geothallus tuberosus. Much of its habitat is near urbanized areas and it is threatened with habitat loss.

The name has occasionally been misspelled in the literature as Sphaerocarpos drewei

References 

Sphaerocarpales
Endemic flora of California
Bryophyta of North America
Natural history of the California chaparral and woodlands
Natural history of Riverside County, California
Natural history of San Diego County, California
Natural history of the Peninsular Ranges
Taxonomy articles created by Polbot
Taxobox binomials not recognized by IUCN